The 2014 Polish local elections were held in two parts, with its first round on November 16, 2014 and second on November 30, 2014.

The first round included elections of deputies to provincial voivodeship sejmiks, as well for gmina and powiat councilors. The second round of elections were marked for mayors, borough leaders, and other positions decided by runoff elections. The local elections were seen as a test to the ruling Civic Platform and Polish People's Party centre-right conservative liberal coalition government under Prime Minister Ewa Kopacz, after then Prime Minister Donald Tusk became the President of the European Council.

Background
It was the first election for new PM and Civic Platform's Leader Ewa Kopacz. Also it had been a test for Law and Justice after good results in latest European Parliament elections in Poland.

Results

Voivodeship Councils

Coalitions in Voivodeship

Parties in each Voivodeship Councils

2014 elections in Poland
History of Poland (1989–present)
Local elections in Poland
November 2014 events in Europe